The fourth season of the American science fiction horror drama television series Stranger Things was released worldwide on the streaming service Netflix in two volumes. The first set of seven episodes was released on May 27, 2022, while the second set of two episodes was released on July 1, 2022. The season was produced by the show's creators the Duffer Brothers, along with Shawn Levy, Dan Cohen, Iain Paterson and Curtis Gwinn. 

Returning as series regulars are Winona Ryder, David Harbour, Millie Bobby Brown, Finn Wolfhard, Gaten Matarazzo, Caleb McLaughlin, Noah Schnapp, Sadie Sink, Natalia Dyer, Charlie Heaton, Joe Keery, Maya Hawke, Priah Ferguson, Matthew Modine and Paul Reiser, while Brett Gelman was promoted to series regular after recurring in the previous two seasons. Jamie Campbell Bower, Joseph Quinn, Eduardo Franco and Cara Buono also star. Tom Wlaschiha, Nikola Đuričko, and Mason Dye appear in recurring roles. 

The season was met with positive reviews, with critics praising the performances of the cast (particularly those of  Brown, Sink, McLaughlin, Bower, and Quinn), the visuals, action sequences, realistic themes, emotional weight, and the darker, more mature tone, though some criticized it for being overstuffed due to the lengthier episode runtimes. The first volume of the season received 13 nominations for the 74th Primetime Emmy Awards, including Primetime Emmy Award for Outstanding Drama Series, winning five.

Premise 
Set in March 1986, eight months after the events of the third season, the fourth season is split between different plotlines. 

The first plotline takes place in Hawkins, where a series of mysterious teenage murders begin haunting the town. Eddie Munson, leader of the Hellfire Club, Hawkins High School Dungeons & Dragons group, becomes a prime suspect in the murders after senior cheerleading captain Chrissy Cunningham dies in his trailer. Dustin Henderson, Lucas and Erica Sinclair, Max Mayfield, Steve Harrington, Nancy Wheeler, and Robin Buckley begin investigating to clear Eddie's name. They discover that the true perpetrator is a powerful being who resides in the Upside Down, whom they later dub "Vecna".

The second plotline involves Mike Wheeler visiting Eleven, Will and Jonathan Byers at their new home in California. Due to the events in Hawkins and the imminent danger to her friends, Eleven goes with Dr. Sam Owens to a secret facility in Nevada to regain her powers, where she is reunited with Dr. Martin Brenner and forced to confront her time in Hawkins National Laboratory. With the military searching for Eleven, Mike, Will, Jonathan, and new friend Argyle try to track her down first.

The third plotline follows Joyce Byers and Murray Bauman as they venture to Russia upon learning that Jim Hopper may still be alive. Meanwhile, Hopper is held in a Soviet prison camp in Kamchatka, where he and the other inmates are forced to battle a Demogorgon that the Russians have captured.

Cast and characters

Main 
 Winona Ryder as Joyce Byers
 David Harbour as Jim Hopper
 Millie Bobby Brown as Eleven / Jane Hopper
 Martie Blair as Young Eleven
 Finn Wolfhard as Mike Wheeler
 Gaten Matarazzo as Dustin Henderson
 Caleb McLaughlin as Lucas Sinclair
 Noah Schnapp as Will Byers
 Sadie Sink as Max Mayfield 
 Belle Henry as Young Max
 Natalia Dyer as Nancy Wheeler
 Charlie Heaton as Jonathan Byers
 Joe Keery as Steve Harrington
 Maya Hawke as Robin Buckley
 Brett Gelman as Murray Bauman
 Priah Ferguson as Erica Sinclair
 Matthew Modine as Martin Brenner
 Paul Reiser as Sam Owens

Also starring 
 Jamie Campbell Bower as Vecna / Henry Creel / One
 Raphael Luce as Young Henry Creel
 Cara Buono as Karen Wheeler
 Eduardo Franco as Argyle
 Joseph Quinn as Eddie Munson

Recurring 
 Joe Chrest as Ted Wheeler
 Mason Dye as Jason Carver
 Tom Wlaschiha as Dmitri "Enzo" Antonov
 Nikola Đuričko as Yuri Ismaylov
 Rob Morgan as Sheriff Powell
 John Reynolds as Officer Callahan
 Sherman Augustus as Lt. Colonel Jack Sullivan
 Myles Truitt as Patrick McKinney
 Gabriella Pizzolo as Suzie
 Tinsley and Anniston Price as Holly Wheeler
 Clayton Royal Johnson as Andy 
 Tristan Spohn as Two
 Christian Ganiere as Ten
 Regina Ting Chen as Ms. Kelly
 Elodie Grace Orkin as Angela
 Logan Allen as Jake
 Hunter Romanillos as Chance
 Pasha D. Lychnikoff as Oleg
 Vaidotas Martinaitis as Warden Melnikov 
 Nikolai Nikolaeff as Ivan
 Paris Benjamin as Agent Ellen Stinson 
 Catherine Curtin as Claudia Henderson
 Karen Ceesay as Sue Sinclair 
 Arnell Powell as Charles Sinclair
 Ira Amyx as Harmon
 Kendrick Cross as Wallace
 Hendrix Yancey as Thirteen

Guests
 Grace Van Dien as Chrissy Cunningham
 Amybeth McNulty as Vickie
 Logan Riley Bruner as Fred Benson
 Joel Stoffer as Wayne Munson
 Dacre Montgomery as Billy Hargrove
 Robert Englund as Victor Creel
 Kevin L. Johnson as Young Victor Creel
 Tyner Rushing as Virginia Creel
 Livi Burch as Alice Creel
 Ed Amatrudo as Director Hatch
 Audrey Holcomb as Eden

Episodes

Production

Development
As with seasons past, planning for the fourth season of Stranger Things began before the preceding season's release. In an interview with Entertainment Weekly that ran shortly after the third season's release, series creators Matt and Ross Duffer revealed the series' creative team had already met on several occasions to discuss the show's future. On September 30, 2019, Netflix announced it had signed the Duffer Brothers for a new multi-year television and film deal that was reportedly worth nine figures. To coincide with the production deal announcement, Netflix also announced the renewal of Stranger Things for a fourth season by releasing a brief, minute-long teaser on YouTube.

Writing 
Commenting on the previous season's ending, Ross Duffer divulged the process of connecting story arcs between seasons:

Matt Duffer indicated one of the plot's "broad strokes" is the main center of action being moved out of Hawkins, Indiana, for the majority of the season, a series first. He also indicated the several loose ends left by the ending of season three, such as Hopper's perceived death and Eleven being adopted by Joyce Byers and relocating with her new family out of state, will all be explored sometime during the fourth season. The Duffers later expanded on their previous comments, saying that "epic" triptych structure of the fourth season was one of the main contributing factors to its exaggerated length. They likened it to the HBO series Game of Thrones in terms of its sheer scale, runtime, and newer, more mature tonal shift, as well as having split their characters across multiple distant locations.

Another contributing factor to the show's newfound extended length was the expressed goal of the Duffers to finally provide answers to uncertainties regarding the series' long-simmering mythology, which they have been slowly revealing like "layers of [an] onion" over the past three seasons. Halfway through writing the fourth season, Matthew and Ross realized they were going to need a ninth episode to include all of their desired plot points, which Netflix in turn "quickly approved". During production on the first season, the duo prepared a twenty-page document for Netflix that explained the show's universe, including what the Upside Down is, in clear detail. In turn, material from the document dictated certain plots while writing the season. The Duffers wanted to spend more time within the Upside Down in this season, as the narrative of the third season gave them little opportunity to explore it further.

Since the fourth season is the longest-running season produced so far, the Duffers and Netflix opted for a two-volume release plan. In a letter from the Duffer Brothers posted by Netflix, the duo revealed they wrote nine scripts spanning over 800 pages, and that the fourth season is nearly double the length of any of the previously released seasons. 

In an interview on the Netflix podcast Present Company with Krista Smith, Ross Duffer discussed season four's much more mature tone, which he indicated will be at least partially achieved by "[leaning] into" the horror genre:

In a May 2022 interview with Entertainment Weekly on their Around the Table series, Finn Wolfhard stated that this season feels like "five movies into one", comparing it to "Scooby-Doo-meets-Zodiac-killer" while also being a "stoner action-comedy" and a "Russian prison movie".

The character of Eddie Munson is based on Damien Echols, one of the West Memphis Three who was wrongly convicted in 1994 of the deaths of three boys due to his appearance, which residents tied to being part of a satanic cult. The writers drew from Paradise Lost, a documentary covering Echols, for Eddie's story.

As they had done with the Demogorgon from the first season, the Duffers opted to use the Dungeons & Dragons character of Vecna as the basis of this season's antagonist, something that the child characters would recognize and understand the dangers due to their familiarity through the role-playing game. While Vecna was not fully introduced in Dungeons & Dragons materials until 1990 through the module Vecna Lives!, and only had been alluded to in the lore prior to that, the Duffers believed that Eddie was an advanced gamemaster that was able to extrapolate how Vecna would behave for purposes of the show.

Casting 
By November 1, 2019, casting had begun to add four new male characters to the fourth season's lineup, with three of the roles being teenagers and one of them being an adult. The teenaged roles were characterized as ranging "from a metalhead to an entitled jock to a character that sounds an awful lot like the twin of Fast Times at Ridgemont High stoner Jeff Spicoli", while the adult character was tied to the Russian storyline introduced during the third season.

On December 3, 2019, it was confirmed by the show's writers' room that Maya Hawke's character Robin would be returning for the fourth season. On February 14, 2020, Netflix confirmed David Harbour would return as Jim Hopper and that Tom Wlaschiha had been cast as a Russian malefactor. Priah Ferguson's return to the series was confirmed in February 2020. That March, Brett Gelman's promotion to series regular was also confirmed. On October 27, 2020, it was reported that Maya Hawke's brother, Levon Thurman-Hawke, was cast in an undisclosed role. 

On November 20, 2020, Jamie Campbell Bower, Eduardo Franco, and Joseph Quinn were cast as series regulars while Sherman Augustus, Mason Dye, Nikola Đuričko, and Robert Englund joined the cast in recurring roles for the fourth season; Englund, best known for portraying Freddy Krueger in the Nightmare on Elm Street films, had approached the Duffers for a role in Stranger Things, which fit well with the direction they wanted to take this season. On June 9, 2021, Amybeth McNulty, Myles Truitt, Regina Ting Chen, and Grace Van Dien joined the cast in recurring roles for the fourth season.

In the case of Bower, he was initially announced as "Peter Ballard", and credits for his role in the first six episodes were listed as "Friendly Orderly". This was to hide the reveal that his character was the grown-up Henry Creel, who was the first test subject for Dr. Brenner and thus named "One", and that he would become Vecna following his battle with Eleven.

Filming 

In February 2020, it was announced in a joint statement from the Duffer Brothers and Netflix that production had officially begun on the fourth season in Vilnius, Lithuania, at the recently decommissioned Lukiškės Prison. After production wrapped in Lithuania, filming resumed in the United States in and around the Atlanta metro area, the primary production location of previous seasons. However, after two weeks of filming, all Netflix productions, including Stranger Things, were halted on March 16, 2020, due to the onset of the COVID-19 pandemic. A significant portion of filming occurred at Albuquerque Studios in New Mexico, which Netflix acquired in 2018.

After several delays, filming resumed on September 28, 2020, in Georgia. On October 1, 2020, Natalia Dyer, Sadie Sink, and Gaten Matarazzo were all spotted filming scenes at the Hawkins Middle School and Hawkins High School sets. The three were also spotted filming scenes at the set for Dustin's house the following day. Filming took place in late 2020 around Rome, Georgia, including exterior shots of the Claremont House, which was used as the Creel House in the show. 

On January 27, 2021, Matthew Modine was spotted filming scenes in Atlanta. On March 15, 2021, set photos were leaked of a trailer park in Griffin, Georgia that was dressed with tendrils from the Upside Down. In June 2021, David Harbour said filming was set to wrap in August. The same month, Joe Keery, Sadie Sink, Natalia Dyer, Maya Hawke, Priah Ferguson, and Caleb McLaughlin were spotted filming a scene that involved buying weapons from a store. In August 2021, a fire with no injuries near one of the filming sets was reported. In September 2021, Noah Schnapp stated that filming had wrapped.

To visually distinguish between the season's three storylines, costume designer Amy Parris revealed that each of the plot's locations will have their own distinct color palette: "It's so fun because [the production team gets] to kind of capture California versus Hawkins through color. So, Hawkins still looks very saturated. We don't have as much as the dusty, rusty brown of Seasons 1 or 2 ... And in California, we get to incorporate baby pinks, and fun teals and purples. It's way more sun-soaked and saturated as opposed to the richer colors of Hawkins." American shoe company Converse designed three different styles of shoes using the Hawkins High School colors to be worn onscreen during a scene depicting a pep rally.

According to Bower, for the key scenes of the massacre at the Hawkins lab, Brown herself helped to direct Martie Blair, who played the younger version of Eleven, so that the multiple filmings of Eleven's interactions with Henry in the lab, some with Brown and some with Blair, were consistent in Eleven's mannerisms.

Post-production 
In April 2022, The Wall Street Journal reported in an article scrutinizing Netflix's recent production expenditures that the total cost to produce season four of Stranger Things was around $270 million, which amounts to roughly $30 million per episode.

Visual effects
Due to the season's considerable length, thousands of visual effect shots were commissioned and rendered during the two-year production and post-production processes. However, the Duffers wanted to rely more on practical effects than computer-generated ones, similar to how the first season was produced. For example, the season's major threat from the Upside Down, a humanoid creature called Vecna, was "90% practical", which the Duffers found created a better presence on the set for the actors to respond to rather than a prop for later computer-generated effects. 

Barrie Gower, a make-up artist that had worked previously on Game of Thrones and Chernobyl, provided the look for Vecna and other creatures. Vecna was loosely based on the Dungeons & Dragons villain of the same name, though the character in the universe of the show is a human "who mutated into a monster from overexposure to the Upside Down ... he's been subjected to all the environments and all the surroundings of the Upside Down basically for 20 odd years." Jamie Campbell Bower, who plays the human character that is turned into Vecna, also played the role of Vecna with the use of planned prosthetics. Once the outfit was prepared, it took about seven hours of work to fit Bower into it.

Gower designed Bower's Vecna costume with "anemic" skin whose integration with the toxic environment of the Upside Down was apparent through the inclusion of "lot of roots and vines and very organic shapes and fibrous muscle tissue." To achieve this look using mostly practical effects, Gower disclosed that he and his team took a full body cast of Bower, to later sculpt to meet their design needs:

As with season three, Montreal-based Rodeo FX was contracted to provide a number of visual effects for the fourth season. One of the most complicated shots they worked on tracked a demobat as it glided through the air towards the Creel house in the Upside Down. Due to its various complexities, the company reports the shot took two years to animate to completion. To animate the death scenes of Vecna's cursed victims, personnel at Rodeo FX conducted "extensive research on broken bones and accidents" so they could properly manipulate the actor's CGI doubles to make their death look convincingly gruesome. The company also animated the demogorgon and demodogs seen in the Kamchatka prison, and updated their designs to better compliment the brighter lighting of the setting that was not present in seasons one and two.

The season was released while the visual effects team were still perfecting the special effects, due to challenges encountered during the COVID-19 pandemic. Production went eight weeks over schedule for the season, without a change to the release date. The amount of visual effects work required for the season during a limited time period led Netflix to bring over some visual effects editors working on other shows they produced to devote more resources to this season. The Duffer brothers said that they updated certain visual effects shots in the season's first volume during its initial release weekend, a practice Netflix has not allowed for any of its past releases. Similarly with volume two, a number of visual effects shots had finished rendering the morning of June 30, a day before the release. The season finale was originally uploaded with an estimated 20 unfinished visual effects shots to meet the release deadline. In all, season four's two-and-a-half hour finale had more visual effects shots than the entirety of season three. Three weeks after the season's release, the visual effects team was still updating visual effects shots at the request of the Duffer brothers.

Music

Both volumes of the original soundtrack album for the fourth season, titled Stranger Things 4, were released digitally on July 1, 2022, via Lakeshore and Invada Records. Like the previous three seasons, the soundtrack was composed by Kyle Dixon and Michael Stein of the electronic band Survive. Both volumes will be also released on physical formats such as CD and vinyl.

The non-original soundtrack companion album for the season, titled Stranger Things: Music from the Netflix Original Series, Season 4, was released digitally in two volumes by Legacy Recordings on May 27 and July 1, respectively. 

Kate Bush's "Running Up That Hill" is featured multiple times during the season, including as part of the key scene in episode 4 with Max escaping from Vecna. The Duffers had envisioned a powerful emotional song for Max and had tasked music supervisor Nora Felder to determine which song would be used. Felder came upon "Running Up That Hill", which the Duffers agreed was a great fit for both the music itself and the theme of dealing with God. Winona Ryder also mentioned in an interview that she had been dropping hints to include the singer since the first season, arriving on sets in her Kate Bush T-shirts. Felder knew that Bush had been cautious on music licensing before, but after contacting her, Felder learned Bush was a fan of the show, and after reviewing the script pages where the song would be used, Bush agreed to clear licensing rights to the song for the show. The song saw a resurgence of popularity with an increase of over 8,700% on streaming charts, reaching the second-most heard song on Spotify playlists in the United States and the fourth-most song for worldwide charts. Metallica's "Master of Puppets" was prominently featured in the season finale when Eddie played its guitar riffs and solo as music to lure and distract demobats in the Upside Down. The song also got a significant boost peaking at number one on streaming platforms, and made listings on music charts in both the U.S. and UK for the first time since the song's original release in 1986.

Other songs featured in season 4, such as Dead or Alive's "You Spin Me Round (Like a Record)", Musical Youth's "Pass the Dutchie", and Falco's "Rock Me Amadeus", also saw increased streaming playbacks of around 1,784 percent. The final two episodes of the season featured period music and classic rock songs such as Siouxsie and the Banshees' "Spellbound", James Taylor‘s "Fire and Rain", Rick Derringer’s "Rock and Roll, Hoochie Koo" and Journey's "Separate Ways (Worlds Apart)".

Marketing
The season's official announcement showed a ticking grandfather clock in the Upside Down and ended with the tagline "We're not in Hawkins anymore," which led many news outlets to speculate the show's setting would be relocated to Russia. A teaser was released on February 14, 2020, showing that Hopper was still alive. On October 2, 2020, the show's various social media accounts posted two photographs from different sets: A poster for a pep rally hanging in a hallway at Hawkins High, and a clapperboard in front of a grandfather clock in the Upside Down, a scene that was first depicted in the season's initial teaser trailer. A second teaser was released on May 6, 2021. 

On August 6, 2021, a sneak peek was released featuring most of the core cast and announcing that the show would return in 2022. On September 25, 2021, a third teaser was released, showcasing the house that was previously owned by the Creel family. The final teaser was released on November 6, 2021, and showed inside Will's and Eleven's lives in California, with the episode titles for the season being revealed on that same day. 

On February 17, 2022, the social media accounts associated with Stranger Things released four teaser posters, one to coincide with the four teasers that were previously released, and a fifth poster, announcing the release date of both volumes. On March 23, 2022, Netflix released various stills from the upcoming fourth season. On April 12, 2022, the first official trailer was released online. On May 20, 2022, the first eight minutes of the season's first episode were released online.

Release
The fourth season was released on the streaming platform Netflix in two volumes, the first volume with seven episodes was released on May 27, 2022, while the second volume with two episodes was released five weeks later on July 1, 2022.

The season's release occurred three days after a mass school shooting in Uvalde, Texas, where a gunman fatally shot 21 people. In the aftermath of the tragedy, and considering that the first episode's cold open — a scene that had been released as an online tease one week before the premiere — features graphic images of dead bodies including those of children's, Netflix added a warning card before the prior season recap that automatically plays before the episode. The card, which is shown only to viewers in the United States, reads as follows:

Shortly after the season's release, viewers reported that Will's friends did not acknowledge his birthday in an episode of the season that took place on that day. The Duffers said in an interview that they could rectify the matter by changing its month, which they called "George Lucas-ing the situation", in reference to the canon changes that George Lucas had made to the original Star Wars trilogy to match what the prequel trilogy had added. Some viewers took this to imply that scenes from earlier seasons were also being edited, including one scene where Jonathan takes discreet pictures of a pool party that Steve, Nancy, and Barbara are holding. The writers stated that "no scenes from previous seasons have ever been cut or re-edited", including this scene. 

On July 1, 2022, after the second volume of the season was released, Netflix's website reportedly crashed due to server overload as vast numbers of users logged on to stream the new episodes, overwhelming the service.

Reception

Viewership 
Netflix reported that by May 30, 2022, Stranger Things 4 had been viewed more than 287 million hours, surpassing the previous first-week viewership record from season two of Bridgerton, which had 193 million hours in its first week. Earlier seasons of Stranger Things also broke into the top 10 viewed programs in the same week as Stranger Things 4 release. With its fourth season, Stranger Things became the second Netflix title to reach more than one billion hours viewed within its first 28 days of release, following Squid Game. It reached 1.352 billion hours of viewership in the first 28 days, making it the second-most viewed program after Squid Game, and the most viewed English-language series ever.

Critical response 
On Rotten Tomatoes, the fourth season holds an approval rating of 88% based on 184 reviews with an average rating of 7.90/10. The site's critical consensus reads, "Darker and denser than its predecessors, Stranger Things fourth chapter sets the stage for the show's final season in typically binge-worthy fashion. On Metacritic, the fourth season's first volume has a score of 69 out of 100, based on 28 reviews, indicating "generally favorable reviews"; the second volume has a score of 72 out of 100, based on 17 reviews, also indicating "generally favorable reviews".

Reviewing for The A.V. Club, Saloni Gajjar gave the season a "B+" and said, "Stranger Things still injects an enthralling backstory into its well-established universe. It’s an indication that the final two episodes of Volume 2 (dropping on July 1), despite its movie length, will only elevate season four." The Guardian's Jack Seale gave it a 4 out of 5 stars and summarized it by saying, "Stranger Things is bigger, older, somewhat sadder – and as lovable as ever." Tilly Pearce of Digital Spy also rated it a 4 out of 5 stars and said "Stranger Things continues to be the beautifully addictive nostalgic thrill ride we know and love. Season four is without a doubt the strongest offering to date and by far the most ambitious." 

Tara Bennett from Paste gave it a score of 8.1 out of 10 and wrote, "There’s a lot to love about Stranger Things Season 4, especially when it comes to some of the character progression and the change in vibe which fully embraces the tropes of the best of ‘80s horror." In a mixed review, Mae Trumata of The Upcoming gave it a 3/5 stars and said "Overall, this is a fun continuation to Stranger Things. For anyone who’s well acquainted and attached to the series and the characters, this is an addition that will either be appreciated or tired of, as it offers nothing significantly new." Author Stephen King reviewed the season as "as good or better than the previous three", pointing out a "Carrie riff". However, King opined that the decision to split the season into two parts is "kind of lame". Sophie Gilbert of The Atlantic was more critical, calling the season "a 13-hour-plus behemoth that added Wes Craven to its mood board but otherwise ended with undeveloped characters and obvious but superficial allusions to contemporary crises."

Critics praised Jamie Campbell Bower's performance as the season's villain. Patrick Caoile of Collider said "For the first time, Stranger Things gives us a villain with layers. Through Vecna, Bower explores a compelling, more complicated villain than the monsters that came before. From his traumatic childhood as Henry Creel to the abusive experiments he went through as One and finally to his role as the Mind Flayer’s top general, Vecna is the perfect villain to pit against Eleven. Another Collider writer Robert Brian Taylor stated, "He's a compelling presence from the moment he first appears. [...] From there his performance continues to shape-shift -- from intriguing to imposing to menacing," and called his monologue scene in episode seven as "hypnotizing" and further deemed the scene as "Stranger Things at its best." Vulture'''s Devon Ivie wrote, "[Bower] has the distinction of embodying three characters, each more unsettling than the last, as the episodes unfurl: a friendly Hawkins Laboratory orderly; Henry Creel, aka "One"; and the most significant villain of the series thus far, Vecna."TVLine named Joseph Quinn the "Performer of the Week" on May 28, 2022, for his performance in the episode "Chapter One: The Hellfire Club", writing: "Quinn took the teenager in short order from curious to concerned, then from panicked to so utterly horrified that he let out the kind of shriek that other shrieks hear and go, “Whoa.” All in all, Quinn’s debut was as auspicious as they come." Caleb McLaughlin was also named the "Performer of the Week" on July 9, 2022 for his performance in the season's final episode "Chapter Nine: The Piggyback". The site wrote: "...after Vecna’s brutal assault of Max, McLaughlin unleashed Lucas' pain with a rawness and urgency that still haunts us. McLaughlin had just shown us what an empowered young man his alter ego had become."TVLine gave Sadie Sink an honorable mention on June 4, 2022 for her performance in the episode "Chapter Four: Dear Billy", writing: "Sink not only nailed the tasks [of Max trying to put on a brave face for her friends despite being anxious and afraid] while still maintaining the edge that her character had received upon enrollment in the school of hard knocks, she also played Max's bittersweet monologue to her late stepbrother with a mixture of sincerity and regret that all but defined the word 'heartbreaking'." Millie Bobby Brown was also an honorable mention on July 2, 2022 for her performance in the penultimate episode "Chapter Eight: Papa". The site wrote: "Brown unleashed a pain and fury that was every bit as impressive as her character's powers. Later, when 'Jane' was offered a chance to rewrite history, in a manner of speaking, Brown beautifully, wordlessly played the emotions that were roiling inside of her alter ego. The scene was complex, deep and tricky to navigate, especially without any dialogue on her part. Yet Brown led us through it as surely as a lantern through a dark night."

The season was listed as one of the best TV shows of 2022, with BuddyTV and PopBuzz placing it at number one. Entertainment.ie ranked it at number five, NME at number eight, ScreenCrush at number 10, and Empire at number 11. In addition, Nerdist'' included it in its unranked list.

Accolades

Awards and nominations

Notes

References

External links 
 
 
 Official screenplay for "The Massacre at Hawkins Lab"

2022 American television seasons
Split television seasons
Fiction about curses
4
Television productions suspended due to the COVID-19 pandemic
Television series set in 1986
Television shows set in Russia